The 1985–86 Women's IHF Cup was the fifth edition of the competition. It was contested by fifteen teams instead of the eighteen of the previous edition, so the preliminary round was suppressed and the defending champion's representative was granted a bye to the quarter-finals. Like the one year before, the final confronted the East German and Hungarian teams, with the same outcome; 2-times European champions HC Leipzig overcame in its arena Debreceni VSC's 6 goals first-leg win to win its fourth IHF title.

First round

Quarter-finals

Semifinals

Final

References

Women's EHF Cup
IHF Cup Women
IHF Cup Women